John Lanning may refer to:
 John S. Lanning, Union Navy sailor and Medal of Honor recipient
 John Tate Lanning, historian of Spanish America 
 Johnny Lanning, American baseball pitcher